Solok Regency is a regency (kabupaten) of West Sumatra, Indonesia. It covers an area of 3,738 km2 and had a population of 348,566 at the 2010 Census and 391,497 at the 2020 Census. The administrative centre of the regency is the town of Arosuka. The city of Solok is administratively separated from the Regency and its area and population are not included in these totals.

Administrative districts

Solok Regency is divided into fourteen districts (kecamatan), listed below with their areas and their populations at the 2010 Census and 2020 Census. The table also includes the locations of the district administrative centres.

Tourism
Besides mining, Solok Regency also has tourism attractions such as Mount Red and White (Gunung Merah Putih) in Nagari Sulit Air, with three waterfalls close to each other. Jonjang Seribu (The Thousand Step Staircase) is another natural attraction.

Solok Regency has two lakes, separated by only 300 metres of land between them, so people call them the Twin Lakes. The upper lake is named as Danau Dibawah and the lower lake is named as Danau Diateh.

Settlements
Solok
Alahan Panjang

References

External links 

 
 

regencies of West Sumatra